Sjötofta is a village situated in Tranemo Municipality, Västra Götaland County, Sweden with 208 inhabitants in 2005.

References 

Populated places in Västra Götaland County
Populated places in Tranemo Municipality